Cosmisoma is a genus of beetles in the family Cerambycidae, containing the following species:

 Cosmisoma acuminatum Zajciw, 1958
 Cosmisoma aeneicollis Erichson in Schomburg, 1848
 Cosmisoma albohirsutotibialis Fuchs, 1966
 Cosmisoma ammiralis (Linnaeus, 1767)
 Cosmisoma angustipenne Zajciw, 1958
 Cosmisoma argyreum Bates, 1870
 Cosmisoma batesi Zajciw, 1962
 Cosmisoma brullei (Mulsant, 1863)
 Cosmisoma cambaia Monné & Magno, 1988
 Cosmisoma capixaba Monné & Magno, 1988
 Cosmisoma chalybeipenne Zajciw, 1962
 Cosmisoma compsoceroides Gounelle, 1911
 Cosmisoma cyaneum Gounelle, 1911
 Cosmisoma debile Monné & Magno, 1988
 Cosmisoma fasciculatum (Olivier, 1795)
 Cosmisoma flavipes Zajciw, 1962
 Cosmisoma gratum Monné & Magno, 1988
 Cosmisoma hirtipes Zajciw, 1962
 Cosmisoma humerale Bates, 1870
 Cosmisoma leucomelas Monné & Magno, 1988
 Cosmisoma lineatum (Kirsch, 1875)
 Cosmisoma lineellum Bates, 1870
 Cosmisoma lividum Monné & Magno, 1988
 Cosmisoma martyr Thomson, 1860
 Cosmisoma militaris Giesbert & Chemsak, 1993
 Cosmisoma nitidipenne Zajciw, 1962
 Cosmisoma ochraceum (Perty, 1832)
 Cosmisoma persimile Gounelle, 1911
 Cosmisoma plumicorne (Drury, 1782)
 Cosmisoma pulcherrimum Bates, 1870
 Cosmisoma reticulatum Bates, 1885
 Cosmisoma rhaptos Giesbert & Chemsak, 1993
 Cosmisoma scopipes (Klug, 1825)
 Cosmisoma scopulicorne (Kirby, 1818)
 Cosmisoma seabrai Monné & Magno, 1988
 Cosmisoma speculiferum (Gory in Guérin-Méneville, 1831)
 Cosmisoma taunayi Melzer, 1923
 Cosmisoma tenellum Aurivillius, 1920
 Cosmisoma tibiale Aurivillius, 1920
 Cosmisoma titania Bates, 1870
 Cosmisoma violaceum Zajciw, 1962
 Cosmisoma viridescens Galileo & Martins, 2010

References

 
Rhopalophorini
Cerambycidae genera